The Philadelphia Phillies are an American professional baseball team based in Philadelphia. They compete in Major League Baseball (MLB) as a member of the National League (NL) East division. Since 2004, the team's home stadium has been Citizens Bank Park, located in the South Philadelphia Sports Complex. Founded in 1883, the Philadelphia Phillies are the oldest continuous same-name, same-city franchise in all of American professional sports. 

As of November 6, 2022, the team has played 21,209 games, winning 10,022 games and losing 11,187.

Before the Phillies won their first World Series in 1980, the team went longer than any of the other MLB 16 teams of the first half of the 20th century without a World Series championship. Since the start of the Divisional Era in 1969, however, the Phillies have emerged as one of MLB's most successful teams, winning 11 division titles (including five consecutive such titles from 2007 to 2011), eight National League pennants, and two World Series championships. 

The franchise was founded in Philadelphia in 1883, replacing the team from Worcester, Massachusetts, in the National League. The team has played at several stadiums in the city, beginning with Recreation Park (1883–1886) and continuing at Baker Bowl (1887–1938); Shibe Park (which was renamed Connie Mack Stadium in 1953 in honor of the longtime Philadelphia Athletics manager Connie Mack) (1938–1970); Veterans Stadium (1971–2003), and now Citizens Bank Park (2004-present).

Because of, and in spite of, their longevity and rabid fan base, the Phillies are a team historically associated with futility. They were the first American sports franchise to amass over 10,000 losses; the team holds the world record for most ever losses by a single team in all of professional sports. Yet, also due in part to their longevity, the Phillies are one of only nine teams to have won over 10,000 games in their history. Hall of Fame third baseman Mike Schmidt is widely considered the franchise's greatest player of all time. Over the team's history since 1883, 33 Phillies players have been awarded entry into the Baseball Hall of Fame.

The Philadelphia Phillies' Triple-A affiliate is the Lehigh Valley IronPigs, who play at Coca-Cola Park in Allentown. The Double-A affiliate is the Reading Fightin Phils, who play in Reading. The Class-A affiliates are the Jersey Shore BlueClaws, who play in Lakewood Township, New Jersey, and the Clearwater Threshers, who play at BayCare Ballpark.

The team's spring training facilities are in Clearwater, Florida.

History

Philadelphia Quakers (1883–1889)

In 1883, sporting goods manufacturer Al Reach (a pioneering professional baseball player) and attorney John Rogers won an expansion National League franchise for Philadelphia, one of what is now known as the "Classic Eight" of the National League. They were awarded a spot in the league to replace the Worcester baseball team, a franchise that had folded in 1882. The new team was nicknamed the "Phillies" from the start, and immediately compiled a .173 winning percentage, which is still the worst in franchise history. Although many sources (including the Phillies themselves) claim that Reach and Rogers bought the Brown Stockings and moved them to Philadelphia, all available evidence suggests this is not the case. Significantly, no players from Worcester ended up with the 1883 Quakers. 

In 1884, Harry Wright, the former manager of baseball's first openly professional team, the Cincinnati Red Stockings, was recruited as a manager in hopes of reversing the team's fortunes.

In 1887, the team began to play at the newly constructed Philadelphia Base Ball Grounds, later renamed National League Park. The stadium would become known as Baker Bowl in 1923. Despite a general improvement from their dismal beginnings, they never seriously contended for the title.

Becoming the Phillies (1890–1917)

The nickname "Phillies" first appeared in The Philadelphia Inquirer on April 3, 1883, in the paper's coverage of an exhibition game by the new National League club and was the team's accepted nickname from the start. This name is one of the longest continually used nicknames in professional sports by a team in the same city.

The franchise's standout players in the era were Billy Hamilton, Sam Thompson, and Ed Delahanty, who in 1896 set the major-league record (since tied by several others) with four home runs in a single game. Due to growing disagreements about the direction of the team, Reach sold his interest to Rogers in 1899.

With the birth of the more lucrative American League (AL) in 1901, the Phillies saw many of their better players defect to the upstart, including a number of players who ended up playing for their crosstown rivals, the Athletics, owned by former Phillies minority owner Benjamin Shibe. While their former teammates would thrive (the AL's first five batting champions were former Phillies), the remaining squad fared dismally, finishing 46 games out of first place in 1902—the first of three straight years finishing either seventh or eighth. 

To add tragedy to folly, a balcony collapsed during a game at the Baker Bowl in 1903, killing 12 and injuring hundreds. Rogers was forced to sell the Phillies to avoid being ruined by an avalanche of lawsuits. In 1904, the team finished with a record of 52–100, making them the first team in franchise history to have lost 100 games.

The Phillies won their first pennant in 1915 thanks to the pitching of Grover Cleveland Alexander and the batting prowess of Gavvy Cravath, who set the 20th century single-season record for home runs with 24. They finished the season with a record of 90–62, seven games ahead of the Boston Braves. The Phillies went up against the Boston Red Sox in the World Series, opening the series at home with a victory. The Phillies struggled against a strong Red Sox pitching lineup and surrendered the next four games, losing the series four games to one. 

The team continued to dominate the National League in 1916 but fell short of capturing a second consecutive pennant. The team finished two and a half games out of first place with a record of 91–62. Alexander won his second consecutive triple crown and posted 16 shutouts, tying the single-season major league record.

In 1917, Alexander had been traded to the Chicago Cubs for pitcher Mike Prendegrast and catcher Pickles Dillhoefer, when owner William Baker refused to increase his salary. Baker was known for running the Phillies very cheaply; for instance, during much of his tenure, there was only one scout in the entire organization. The Phillies finished the 1917 season in second place with a record of 87–65, ten games behind the New York Giants.

Three decades of struggle (1918–1948)

The effect of the Alexander trade was immediate. In 1918, only three years after winning the pennant, the Phillies finished sixth, 13 games under .500. It was the start of one of the longest streaks of futility in baseball history. From 1918 to 1948, the Phillies had only one winning record, which came in 1932. The team finished higher than sixth only twice, and were never a serious factor past June. During this stretch, they finished eighth (last place) a total of 17 times and seventh seven times, with 12 seasons in which they lost at least 100 games. This saddled the franchise with a reputation for failure that dogged it for many years. The team's primary stars during the 1920s and 1930s were outfielders Cy Williams, Lefty O'Doul, and Chuck Klein, who won the Triple Crown in 1933.

Baker died in 1930. He left half his estate to his wife and the other half to longtime team secretary Mae Mallen. Five years earlier, Mallen had married a leather goods and shoe dealer, Gerald Nugent. With the support of Baker's widow, Nugent became team president. Baker's widow died in 1932, leaving Nugent in complete control. Unlike Baker, Nugent badly wanted to build a winning team, however, he did not have the financial means to do so. He was forced to trade what little talent the team had to make ends meet, and often had to use some creative financial methods to field a team at all.

Philadelphia's Baker Bowl proved to be a fertile hitting ground for Phillies opponents as well, and in 1930, the team surrendered 1199 runs, a major-league record still standing today. Once considered one of the finest parks in baseball, it was not well maintained from the 1910s onward. For instance, until 1925, the Phillies used a flock of sheep to trim the grass. Fans were often showered with rust whenever one of Klein's home runs hit girders.  The entire right field grandstand collapsed in 1926, forcing the Phillies to move to the A's Shibe Park (five blocks west on Lehigh Avenue from Baker Bowl) for 1927.
The Phillies tried to move to Shibe Park on a permanent basis as tenants of the A's. However, Baker Bowl's owner, Charles W. Murphy, at first refused to let the Phillies out of their lease. He finally relented in 1938, and only then because the city threatened to condemn the dilapidated park. Despite the move, attendance rarely topped 3,000 a game.

The lowest point came in 1941, when the Phillies finished with a 43–111 record, setting a franchise record for losses in a season. A year later, they needed an advance from the league just to go to spring training. Nugent realized he did not have enough money to operate the team in 1943, and put it up for sale.

After lumber baron William D. Cox purchased the team with a group of investors for $190,000 and a $50,000 note on March 15, 1943, the Phillies rose out of last place for the first time in five years. As a result, the fan base and attendance at home games increased. Eventually, Cox revealed that he had been betting on the Phillies, and he was banned from baseball by baseball Commissioner Kenesaw Mountain Landis on Nov. 23, 1943. The new owner, Bob Carpenter Sr., scion of the Delaware-based duPont family, bought the team with his son for an estimated $400,000 that same day – November 23, 1943. The Carpenters tried to polish the team's image and way of doing business. Carpenter Sr. named his son, Bob Carpenter, Jr., team president. They wanted to shed the image of failure by changing the team's nickname.

Philadelphia Blue Jays
Before the 1944 season, the team held a fan contest soliciting a new team nickname. Management chose "Blue Jays", the fan submission of Elizabeth Crooks, who received a $100 war bond as compensation. The Phillies would later claim in the 2000s that the Blue Jays moniker was never official, however news reports in 1944 note that Phillies management said that the Blue Jays name was as an official "additional nickname", meaning that the team had two official nicknames simultaneously, the Phillies and the Blue Jays. 

The Phillies' official adoption of Blue Jays as a second official nickname led to a dispute with Johns Hopkins University, whose nickname is and was Blue Jays. Wilson Shaffer, then-athletic director of the Baltimore-based school, criticized the Philadelphia team for adopting his university's moniker, and said that Philadelphia should use the blue jay's Binomial nomenclature name instead and be known as the Philadelphia Cyanocitta Cristata. Similarly, the university's student council, citing the Philadelphia team's long track record of failure, passed a resolution demanding "suitable satisfaction" for what they perceived as theft and sullying of the Blue Jays name. Carpenter, Jr., responded by criticizing Johns Hopkins' baseball record and promised to make the students proud of the Blue Jays name by having his Philadelphia baseball team win many games.

The Philadelphia team added three minor league clubs before the start of the 1946 season and named them all Blue Jays: the Class C Salina Blue Jays, Class C Schenectady Blue Jays and Class D Green Bay Blue Jays. 

However, the new Blue Jays moniker was ultimately unpopular, and although the team in the 2000s claimed that it was quietly dropped by 1949, news reports at the time indicate that the nickname, which "never caught on anyway", was not officially dropped by the team until January 1950.

(The Blue Jays moniker would be used by Toronto's MLB club when it started play in 1977.)

Fightin’ Phils (1949–1970)

Like Cox, Bob Carpenter Jr. was not afraid to spend the money it took to build a contender. He immediately started signing young players and invested even more money in the farm system, and the Phillies quickly developed a solid core of young players that included future Hall of Famers Richie Ashburn and Robin Roberts. This coincided with the final collapse of the A's. Philadelphia had been an "A's town" for most of the first half of the 20th century. Even though the A's had fielded teams as bad or worse than the Phillies for most years since the 1930s, the A's continued to trounce the Phillies at the gate. However, a series of poor baseball and business decisions on the A's part allowed the Phillies to win the hearts of Philadelphia's long-suffering fans.

Things started coming together for the Phillies in 1949, when they rocketed up the standings to third place with an 81–73 record. Although the season had essentially been a two-team race between Brooklyn and St. Louis, it was still the Phillies' first appearance in the first division in 31 years. It was also a fitting tribute to Bob Carpenter Sr., who had died in June and left Bob Jr. in full control of the team.

The 1950 Phillies led the National League standings for most of the season and were dubbed the "Whiz Kids". In the final months of the season, a tailspin (triggered by the loss of starting pitcher Curt Simmons to National Guard service) caused the team to lose the next eight of ten games. On the last day of the season, the Phillies hung on to a one-game lead when Dick Sisler’s dramatic tenth inning home run against the Brooklyn Dodgers clinched the Phillies' first pennant in 35 years. In the World Series, exhausted from their late-season plunge and victims of poor luck, the Phillies were swept by the New York Yankees in four straight games. Nonetheless, this appearance cemented the Phillies' status as the city's favorite team.

In contrast, the Philadelphia Athletics finished last in 1950, and longtime manager Connie Mack retired. The team struggled for four more years with only one winning season before abandoning Philadelphia under the Johnson brothers, who bought out Mack. They began to play in Kansas City in 1955. As part of the deal selling that team to the Johnson brothers, the Phillies bought Shibe Park, where both teams had played since 1938. Many thought that the "Whiz Kids", with a young core of talented players, would be a force in the league for years to come. However, the team finished with a 73–81 record in 1951 and finished nine and a half games out of first place in 1952, with an 87–67 record. The Phillies managed to end up in third place in 1953 with an 83–71 record, however, they would fail to break .500 from 1954 to 1957.

It became apparent that the flash and determination of the Whiz Kids would not return when the team finished last place in the National League from 1958 to 1961. Manager Eddie Sawyer abruptly quit the team after the season opener in 1960, and was replaced by Gene Mauch.

The team's competitive futility was highlighted by a record that still stands: in 1961, the Phillies lost 23 games in a row, the worst losing streak in the majors since 1900. Things started to turn around for the team in 1962, when the team finished above .500 for the first time in five years. Gene Mauch was named National League Manager of the Year that season and won it again in 1964. The team improved in 1963, when the team finished the season with an 87–75 record. There was confidence that the team would soon become contenders for a return to the World Series. Though Ashburn and Roberts were gone, the 1964 Phillies still had younger pitchers Art Mahaffey, Chris Short, and rookie Ray Culp; veterans Jim Bunning and screwballer Jack Baldschun; and fan favorites Cookie Rojas, Johnny Callison, and NL Rookie of the Year Dick Allen. The team was 90–60 on September 20, good enough for a lead of 6.5 games in the pennant race with 12 games to play. However, the Phillies lost 10 games in a row and finished one game out of first, losing the pennant to the St. Louis Cardinals. The "Phold of '64" is frequently mentioned as the worst collapse in sports history.

One highlight of the 1964 season occurred on Father's Day, when Jim Bunning pitched a perfect game against the New York Mets, the first in Phillies' history.

For the rest of the decade, the team finished no higher than fourth place in the NL standings which came during the 1966 season. In the 1969 season, the Phillies finished fifth in the newly created NL East Division, with a record of 63–99.

By the late 1950s, Carpenter decided the Phillies needed a new home. He never wanted to buy Connie Mack Stadium in the first place, and was now convinced there was no way he could make money playing there. He sold the park to Philadelphia Eagles' owner Jerry Wolman in 1964, taking a $1 million loss on his purchase of just 10 years earlier. The stadium was deteriorating and there was inadequate parking. Attendance began to drop by 1967 and the team started to plan for a new stadium. 

The Phillies remained at Connie Mack Stadium until 1970. In the last game played there, the Phillies avoided last place by beating the Expos 2–1. When the game was finished several fans in attendance began to remove items from the ballpark, such as chairs, outfield panels and baseball equipment from the dugouts.

Glory days (1971–1984)

The Phillies opened the new Veterans Stadium in 1971. The team wore new maroon uniforms to accentuate the change. The stadium was built in South Philadelphia, making it the first time the team was not located in North Philadelphia. The new stadium, along with nearby John F. Kennedy Stadium and the Spectrum, established the South Philadelphia Sports Complex. 

Pitcher Rick Wise hurled a no-hitter and in the same game hit two home runs against the Cincinnati Reds in 1971. That same season, Harry Kalas joined the Phillies broadcasting team. 

In 1972, the Phillies were the worst team in baseball, but newly acquired Steve Carlton won nearly half their games (27 of 59 team wins) and was awarded his first NL Cy Young Award and won it again in 1977. Bob Carpenter Jr. retired in 1972 and passed the team ownership to his son Ruly. 

The Phillies achieved some success in the mid-1970s. With players such as Carlton, third baseman Mike Schmidt, shortstop Larry Bowa, catcher Bob Boone, and outfielder Greg Luzinski, the Phillies won three straight division titles (1976–78). However, they fell short in the NLCS, against the Reds in 1976 and the Dodgers in 1977 and 1978. In 1979, the Phillies acquired Pete Rose, the spark that would put them over the top.

1980 World Series champions

The Phillies won the National League East in 1980, but to win the league championship, they had to defeat the Houston Astros. In a memorable NLCS, with four of the five games needing extra innings, they fell behind 2–1 but battled back to squeeze past the Astros on a 10th-inning game-winning hit by center fielder Garry Maddox, and the city celebrated its first NL pennant in 30 years. The entire series saw only one home run hit, a game-winning two-run home run by Phillies slugger Greg Luzinski in the Phillies' opening 3–1 win in Game 1 at Philadelphia.

Facing the Kansas City Royals in the 1980 World Series, the Phillies won their first World Series championship ever in six games thanks to the timely hitting of Mike Schmidt and Pete Rose. Schmidt, who won the National League Most Valuable Player Award in 1980, also won the World Series Most Valuable Player award on the strength of his 8-for-21 hitting (.381 average), including game-winning hits in Game 2 and the clinching Game 6. This final game was also significant because it remains "the most-watched game in World Series history" with a television audience of 54.9 million viewers. Thus, the Phillies became the last of the 16 teams that made up the Major Leagues from 1903 to 1960 to win a World Series. Carlton captured his third NL Cy Young Award with a record of 24–9.

After their series win, Ruly Carpenter, who had been given control of the team in 1972 when his father stepped down as team president, sold the team for $32.5 million in 1981 to a group that was headed by longtime Phillies executive Bill Giles.

The Phillies returned to the playoffs in 1981, which were split in half due to a players' strike. In five games, they were defeated in the first-ever National League Division Series by the Montreal Expos. Mike Schmidt won his second consecutive NL Most Valuable Player award that year. In 1982, the team finished three games behind the St. Louis Cardinals in the East Division, narrowly missing the playoffs. Carlton captured his fourth career NL Cy Young Award that year with 23 wins. 

For the 1983 season, the Phillies returned to the playoffs and beat the Los Angeles Dodgers. They won this series in four games to capture their fourth NL pennant; however, they lost to the Baltimore Orioles in the World Series in five games. John Denny was named the 1983 NL Cy Young Award winner. Because of the numerous veterans on the 1983 team, Philadelphia Daily News sportswriter Stan Hochman gave them the nickname, the "Wheeze Kids".

In 1984, the team finished fourth in the NL East with a record of 81–81. Mike Schmidt still remained a dominant force on the team by leading the National League in both home runs and runs batted in.

Years of struggle (1985–1991)
The 1985 season was the first time the team finished below .500 since 1974. The team had some success in 1986 despite having released star pitcher Steve Carlton due to injuries. They went on to finish second in the division with a record of 86–75. Mike Schmidt led the National League in home runs and runs batted in that year and also won his third National League Most Valuable Player award, sixth Silver Slugger award and tenth Gold Glove.

In 1987, closer Steve Bedrosian was named the NL Cy Young Award winner. 

Injuries caused Mike Schmidt to miss most of the 1988 season and he retired from baseball after playing in only 42 games in 1989, thus, the last member of the 1980 championship team was gone.

In 1990, Terry Mulholland lost a perfect game in the seventh inning when a San Francisco Giants' batter reached base on a throwing error. The next batter grounded into a double play. Thus, Mulholland faced the perfect-game maximum of 27 batters, but did not qualify for a perfect game. He was credited, however, with a no-hitter. 

During this time, the Phillies often struggled to attract more than 25,000 people to Veterans Stadium, the biggest in the National League at the time (at over 62,000 seats). Even crowds of 40,000 were swallowed up by the cavernous environment.

Macho Row (1992–1995)

Before the 1992 season, the organization decided to shed the maroon uniform and logo and use colors similar to those used during the days of the "Whiz Kids". The season ended with the Phillies at the bottom of the standings—last place in the National League East. However, their fortunes were about to change.

The 1993 Phillies were led by stars such as Darren Daulton, John Kruk, Lenny Dykstra, and Curt Schilling. The team was dubbed "Macho Row" for their shaggy, unkempt, and dirty look. Their character endeared them to fans, and attendance reached a record high the following season. 

The team powered their way to a 97–65 record and an NL East division title, all thanks to a big April in which the Phillies went 17–5. The Phillies' major contributors on offense were Dykstra, Kruk, Kevin Stocker (a rookie who led the team in batting average, hitting .324), and Jim Eisenreich, all of whom hit over .300 for the season. Their pitching staff was led by 16-game winners Curt Schilling and Tommy Greene. Each member of the rotation posted at least 10 wins, while the bullpen was led by elder statesman Larry Andersen and closer Mitch "Wild Thing" Williams, who notched 43 saves and a 3.34 ERA.

They beat the Atlanta Braves in the 1993 National League Championship Series, four games to two, to earn the fifth NL pennant in franchise history, only to be defeated by the defending World Series champion Toronto Blue Jays in the 1993 World Series. Toronto's Joe Carter hit a walk-off home run in Game 6 to clinch another Phillies' loss.

The 1994–95 Major League Baseball strike was a blow to attendance and on-field success, as was the arrival of the Atlanta Braves in the division due to league realignment. Several players from the 1993 team were either traded or left the team soon after.

Rebuilding years (1996–2005)

The team drafted third baseman Scott Rolen in the second round of the 1993 amateur draft. He had reached the majors by 1996 and was named National League Rookie of the Year in 1997. After becoming frustrated with management he demanded a trade and was dealt to the St. Louis Cardinals in 2002.

Former Phillie Larry Bowa was hired as manager for the 2001 season, and led the Phillies to an 86–76 record, their first winning season since the 1993 World Series year. They spent most of the first half of the season in first place, and traded first place with the Braves for most of the second half. In the end, they finished two games out of first. Bowa was named National League Manager of the Year.

The Phillies continued to contend for the next few years under Bowa, with the only blemish being an 80–81 season in 2002. On December 6, 2002, Jim Thome, a free agent, signed a six-year, $85 million contract with the team.

Between 1996 and 2002, the team drafted players who would soon become the core of the team including Jimmy Rollins, Pat Burrell, Chase Utley, Ryan Howard, and Cole Hamels. In 2004, the Phillies moved to their new home, Citizens Bank Park, across the street from Veterans Stadium.

Charlie Manuel took over the club's reins from Bowa after the 2004 season, and general manager Ed Wade was replaced by Pat Gillick in November 2005. Gillick reshaped the club as his own, bringing in players such as Shane Victorino, Jayson Werth, and Jamie Moyer.

The Golden era (2006–2012)

Ryan Howard won the NL Most Valuable Player Award for the 2006 season and Jimmy Rollins won the award the following year. After the franchise lost its 10,000th game in 2007, its core of young players responded by winning the National League East division title, but they were swept by the Colorado Rockies in the Division Series. After the 2007 season, they acquired closer Brad Lidge through a trade with the Houston Astros.

2008 World Series champions

Though the Phillies were named in some publications as the favorites to repeat as division champions in 2008, they did not get off to the blazing April start that many had hoped for. Still, they managed their first winning opening month since 2003, and only their fourth since their last World Series appearance.

Chase Utley and Brad Lidge represented the team at the 2008 Major League Baseball All-Star Game, with Utley garnering the most votes of all National League players. In a move to bolster their starting rotation in preparation for the pennant race, the Phillies traded three minor league players to the Athletics for starting pitcher Joe Blanton on July 17.

On September 27, the Phillies clinched the National League East for the second year in a row. They won the NLDS three games to one against the Milwaukee Brewers, and they defeated the Dodgers in Los Angeles as well, 4–1. As the National League champions, the Phillies advanced to the 2008 World Series to play the Tampa Bay Rays, winning the series 4 games to 1. Game 5 began on Monday, October 27, and was suspended after the top of the 6th inning, with the scored tied 2-2. The game resumed Wednesday, October 29, with the Phillies winning the game 4-3 and capturing their second world series in franchise history. Prior to this, there had never been a rain-shortened game in World Series history, and this was the first suspension. Cole Hamels won the Most Valuable Player Award for both the NLCS and the World Series. 

Pat Gillick retired as general manager after the 2008 season and was succeeded by one of his assistants, Rubén Amaro Jr. After adding outfielder Raúl Ibañez to replace the departed Pat Burrell, the Phillies retained the majority of their core players for the 2009 season. In July, they signed three-time Cy Young Award winner Pedro Martínez and acquired 2008 American League Cy Young winner Cliff Lee before the trade deadline. On September 30, 2009, they clinched a third consecutive National League East Division title for the first time since the 1976–78 seasons.

The team beat the Colorado Rockies in the NLDS and the Los Angeles Dodgers in the NLCS to become the first Phillies team to win back-to-back pennants and the first National League team since the 1996 Atlanta Braves to have an opportunity to defend their World Series title. However, the Phillies were unable to repeat the 2008 World Series victory; they were defeated in the 2009 series by the New York Yankees, four games to two. In recognition of the team's recent accomplishments, Baseball America named the Phillies its Organization of the Year.

On December 16, 2009, they acquired starting pitcher Roy Halladay from the Toronto Blue Jays for three minor-league prospects, and traded Cliff Lee to the Seattle Mariners for three prospects.  On May 29, 2010, Halladay pitched a perfect game against the Florida Marlins. In June 2010, the team's scheduled series against the Toronto Blue Jays at Rogers Centre was moved to Philadelphia, because of security concerns for the G-20 Summit. The Blue Jays wore their home white uniforms and batted last as the home team, and the designated hitter was used. The game was the first occasion of the use of a designated hitter in a National League ballpark in a regular-season game; Ryan Howard was the first player to fill the role.

The 2010 Phillies won their fourth consecutive NL East Division championship despite a rash of significant injuries to key players. After dropping seven games behind the Atlanta Braves on July 21, Philadelphia finished with an MLB-best record of 97–65. The streak included a 20–5 record in September, the Phillies' best September since winning 22 games that month in 1983, and an 11–0 run in the middle of the month. The acquisition of pitcher Roy Oswalt in early August was a key step, as Oswalt won seven consecutive games in just over five weeks from August 11 through September 17. The Phillies clinched the division on September 27, behind a two-hit shutout by Halladay.

In Game 1 of the 2010 National League Division Series, Halladay threw the second no-hitter in Major League Baseball postseason history, leading the Phillies over the Cincinnati Reds, 4–0. (The first was New York Yankees pitcher Don Larsen's perfect game in the 1956 World Series.) Halladay's no-hitter was the fifth time a pitcher has thrown two no-hitters in the same season, and was also the first time that one of the two occurred in the postseason. The Phillies went on to sweep the Reds in three straight games. 

In the 2010 National League Championship Series, the Phillies fell to the eventual World Series champion San Francisco Giants in six games. Halladay was named the 2010 NL Cy Young Award winner.

Before the start of the 2011 season, the Phillies signed pitcher Cliff Lee to a five-year deal, bringing him back to the team and forming a formidable rotation of Halladay, Lee, Hamels, Oswalt, and Blanton. Including Vance Worley, who replaced Joe Blanton due to injury. The rotation combined for a win–loss record of 71–38, and an earned run average of 2.86, the best in the majors that year. Commentators called it one of the best rotations ever assembled. Halladay, Oswalt, Lee, and Hamels were dubbed two nicknames by fans and media: the "Phantastic Phour" and "The Four Aces". On September 17, 2011, the Phillies won their fifth consecutive East Division championship, and on September 28, during the final game of the season, the team set a franchise record for victories in a season with 102 by beating the Atlanta Braves in 13 innings, denying their division rivals a potential wild card berth. Yet the Phillies lost in the NLDS to the St. Louis Cardinals—the team that won the National League Wild Card as a result of the Phillies beating the Braves. The Cardinals subsequently beat the Brewers in the NLCS and won the 2011 World Series in seven games over the Texas Rangers. 

The 2012 Phillies experienced an up and down season. They played .500 ball through the first two months, but then slumped through a 9–19 stretch in June where they ended up at the bottom of the NL East by mid-season. With any hope dimming, the Phillies traded key players Shane Victorino and Joe Blanton to the Los Angeles Dodgers, and Hunter Pence to the San Francisco Giants before the trade deadline. A hot start in the second half of the season put the Phillies back on the postseason hunt, but any hope was eventually extinguished with a loss to the Washington Nationals on September 28, costing the Phillies the postseason for the first time since 2006.

The Phillies' win–loss record never went below .500 during this time; and the team won the NL East five years in a row from 2007 to 2011.

End of an era (2013–2018) 
During the 2013 season, the team struggled again and was unable to consistently play well for the majority of the season. On August 16, 2013, with the team's record at 53–68, the Phillies fired manager Charlie Manuel, who had managed the team since 2005, and promoted third-base coach Ryne Sandberg to interim manager. Manuel had spent over nine years as manager, leading Philadelphia to its first World Series victory in nearly 30 years and amassing an overall record of 780–636 to become the manager with the most wins in the franchise's history. The 2013 Phillies ended up with a record of 73–89, their first losing season since 2002. In the off-season, pitcher Roy Halladay retired from baseball.

In the 2014 season, one of the few bright spots was the September 1 game against a division rival, the Atlanta Braves, when starter Cole Hamels and relievers Jake Diekman, Ken Giles, and Jonathan Papelbon combined for a no-hitter at Turner Field and a 7–0 victory over Atlanta. In the first round of the 2014 MLB Draft the Phillies selected pitcher Aaron Nola with the 7th overall pick. The team could not gain momentum during the season and finished last in the NL East, the first time they had done so since 2000. During the off-season, Jimmy Rollins waived his no-trade clause and was traded to the Los Angeles Dodgers, while Cliff Lee pitched his last game and was sidelined for the entire 2015 season due to injury. 

In 2015, attendance began to drop as the team showed little improvement and it was clear that the remnants of the 2008 World Series team would soon be departing. Sandberg resigned as manager and bench coach Pete Mackanin was brought in as interim manager. Cole Hamels no-hit the Chicago Cubs 5–0 at Wrigley Field, on July 25, striking out 13 and giving up only two walks. It was the first no-hitter against the Cubs since Sandy Koufax's perfect game in 1965, and first at Wrigley Field since the Cubs' Milt Pappas in 1972. Hamels was dealt to the Texas Rangers, six days later. The following month saw the departure of Chase Utley who was traded to the Dodgers. In September, general manager Rubén Amaro Jr. was fired and Andy MacPhail was brought in as the interim general manager. The team once again finished last in the NL East with a record of 63–99. McPhail was officially named the organization's President of Baseball Operations during the off season. The team then hired Matt Klentak as the new general manager. 

In 2016, the team finished fourth in the NL East, only winning eight more games than they had the previous year, with a 71–91 record. The 2016 season was the last for both Ryan Howard and Carlos Ruiz in a Phillies' uniform. Ruiz was traded to the Dodgers in late August, reuniting him with Chase Utley. The team decided to not exercise their club option on Howard, thus making him a free agent. 

On September 29, 2017, Pete Mackanin was fired as manager. The Phillies announced Gabe Kapler as their new manager on October 30, 2017. Kapler had been the Director of Player Development for the Los Angeles Dodgers since November 2014. He led the Phillies in the right direction in the first half of the 2018 season, as they had a 59–48 record at the July 31st trade deadline and were leading the NL East division by 1.5 games over the Atlanta Braves. However, a late-season collapse where they went 21–34 from August to the end of the season led to the Phillies finishing with an 80–82 record and third in the division. Aaron Nola amassed a record of 17–6 with a 2.37 earned run average and 0.975 WHIP. He finished third in the National League Cy Young race, behind the Nationals' Max Scherzer and the winner, the Mets' Jacob DeGrom.

Building a winning team (2019–present)

The Phillies intended to start targeting valuable free agents as soon as the 2018 season was over. Owner John Middleton said they were willing to "spend stupid money". During the off-season, the Phillies signed Andrew McCutchen, David Robertson, and made the splash of the offseason by signing Bryce Harper to a 13-year, $330 million deal, taking him away from the division rival Washington Nationals. The team also made many trades, including trading for the Mariners' shortstop Jean Segura and the Marlins' catcher J.T. Realmuto. The Phillies got off to a hot start the first two months, going 33–22 but collapsed from there. They were eliminated from the playoffs on September 24 in the first game of a day-night double-header against Harper's former team and the eventual World Series champions, the Nationals, on their way to finishing with a record of 81–81. Owner John Middleton fired Manager Gabe Kapler on October 10, 2019, after ten days of intense deliberations with insiders and outsiders alike.

On October 24, 2019, the Philadelphia Phillies announced Joe Girardi as their 55th manager of the team, signing a three-year deal with the Phillies with an option for the 2023 season. 

The team failed to get a winning season in the COVID-shortened 2020 season and finished with a 28-32 record and failed to enter the playoffs, and the Miami Marlins, a team sometimes ridiculed as weaker than Phillies, ended up getting in playoffs in 2020, so on October 3, 2020, Matt Klentak was relieved from General Manager. On December 11, 2020, the Phillies hired Dave Dombrowski as the President Of Baseball Operations. On December 22, 2020, Dombrowski hired Sam Fuld as the General Manager.  

In 2021, the Phillies finished the season with an 82-80 record, the first winning season since 2011, but failed to make the playoffs. One major highlight of the season was Bryce Harper winning the NL Most Valuable Player Award for the 2021 season. The team targeted high profile free agents during the offseason and improved their lineup by signing outfielders Kyle Schwarber and Nick Castellanos.

2022 World Series

The Phillies got off to a sluggish 22–29 start to the 2022 season. On June 3, the Phillies fired manager Joe Girardi and replaced him with bench coach Rob Thomson, who was named the team's interim manager. The Phillies ended the 2022 season 87–75, reaching the playoffs for the first time since 2011. 

In the postseason, the Phillies faced the St. Louis Cardinals in the National League Wild Card Series for a best of three series, winning in two games. They went on to eliminate the defending World Champion Atlanta Braves three games to one in the National League Division Series, advancing to the National League Championship Series where they would face the San Diego Padres. The Phillies won the series four games to one and would advance to the 2022 World Series. Bryce Harper was named MVP of the NLCS. On October 10, the Phillies also removed the interim role of Thomson and named him the team's manager.

The Phillies faced the American League champion Houston Astros in a best of seven World Series that began October 28 at Minute Maid Park in Houston. The Astros entered the series as the top seeded team in the American League and with an undefeated record in the postseason of 7-0. Game 1 ended with the Phillies winning the game in extra innings by a score of 6-5, with catcher J.T. Realmuto hitting the game winning home run in the top of the 10th inning. The Astros would even the series at 1-1 in Game 2, with the series going to Philadelphia for the first time since 2009. Game 3 at Citizens Bank Park was originally scheduled to take place on October 31, but was postponed until the following day due to rain, which also moved the rest of the series games back by a day. The Phillies would take Game 3 by a score of 7-0, which was a result of the team hitting five home runs in the first five innings of the game, the first time this had occurred in World Series history. All five home runs were given up by Astros pitcher Lance McCullers Jr., which became a record for most home runs surrendered by a pitcher in a World Series game. In Game 4, the Astros answered back by winning the game 5-0 and throwing a combined no-hitter, the first combined no-hitter in postseason history, and just the second no-hitter of any type in a World Series after Don Larsen's perfect game in 1956. The Astros won the next two games, winning the series four games to two. The Phillies' game six loss, coming shortly after the Philadelphia Union fell in the championship game of the MLS Cup, made Philadelphia the first American city to lose two major professional sports championship title games in the same day.

Team uniforms

Current uniforms
The current team colors, uniform, and logo date back to 1992. The main team colors are red and white, with blue serving as a prominent accent. The team name is written in red with a blue star serving as the dot over the "i"s, and blue piping is often found in Phillies' branded apparel and materials. The team's home uniform is white with red pinstripes, lettering and numbering. The road uniform is traditional grey with red lettering/numbering. Both bear a script-lettered "Phillies" logo, with the aforementioned star dotting the "i"s across the chest, and the player name and number on the back. The uniform's front script has undergone minor changes over the years. Hats are red with a single stylized "P".  The uniforms and logo are very similar to those used during the "Whiz Kids" era from 1950 to 1969.

The Phillies and the St. Louis Cardinals are the only MLB teams to utilize chain stitching in their chest emblems.

In 2008, the Phillies introduced an alternate, cream-colored uniform during home day games—a tribute to their 125th anniversary. The uniforms are similar to those worn from 1946 through 1949, featuring red lettering bordered with blue piping and lacking pinstripes. The accompanying cap is blue with a red bill and a red stylized "P". The uniforms were announced on November 29, 2007, when Phillies shortstop Jimmy Rollins, pitcher Cole Hamels, and Hall of Fame pitcher Robin Roberts modeled the new uniforms.

For the 2009 season the Phillies wore black, circular "HK" patches over their hearts in memory of broadcaster Harry Kalas, who died April 13, 2009, just before he was to broadcast a Phillies game in Washington, D.C. From Opening Day through July 26, 2009, the Phillies wore 2008 World Champions patches on the right sleeve of their home uniforms to celebrate their World Series victory the season prior. After the death of Hall of Fame pitcher Robin Roberts on May 6, 2010, the Phillies wore a black patch with a white "36" on the sleeves of their jerseys in memory of Roberts for the remainder of the 2010 season. Number 36 had been retired previously by the team in 1962 to honor Roberts. For the 2011 season, the Phillies wore a black circular patch with a "B" in honor of minority owners Alexander and John Buck, who died in late 2010. For the 2014 season, the Phillies wore a black circular patch with initials “CB” in honor of former owner Claire Betz, who died during the offseason. For the 2015 season, the Phillies wore a black circular patch with a white "SLB" in memory of minority owner Sara L. Buck, who died on August 23, 2014. For the 2017 season, the Phillies wore a black circular patch on their sleeves featuring the "baseball stitched" center swirl "P" used from 1970 to 1991 inside the white silhouette of a capital "D" in memory of former manager Dallas Green, who led the franchise to its first World Series championship and died on March 22, 2017. Following the death of former chairman, minority-owner, and president David Montgomery on May 8, 2019, the Phillies added a black circular patch with white "DPM" letters in memory of Montgomery for the remainder of the 2019 season. For the 2021 season, the Phillies wore a patch with the number "15" on it in honor of former player Dick Allen, who died the previous year.

In 2016, the Phillies added a red alternate uniform, similar to their spring training uniforms, to be used for mid-week afternoon games. It was unofficially retired following the 2017 season, after which the Phillies revived their powder blue throwbacks as an alternate uniform to be used on select Thursday home games. The red alternates were brought back for select road games in 2021.

The Phillies are one of four teams in Major League Baseball that do not display the name of their city, state, or region on their road jerseys, joining the Los Angeles Angels, St. Louis Cardinals, and the Tampa Bay Rays. The Phillies are the only team that also displays the player's number on one sleeve, except on the alternate jersey, in addition to the usual placement on the back of the jersey.

Batting practice
The Phillies were an early adopter of the batting practice jersey in 1977, wearing a maroon v-necked top with the "Phillies" script name across the chest, as well as the player name and number on the back and a player number on the left sleeve, all in white. Larry Bowa, Pete Rose, and Mike Schmidt wore this maroon batting jersey in place of their road jersey during the 1979 All-Star Game in Seattle. Currently, during spring training, the Phillies wear solid red practice jerseys with pinstriped pants for Grapefruit League home games. The red jerseys are worn with grey pants on the road.

Former uniforms

From 1970 to 1991, the Phillies sported colors, uniforms, and a logo that were noticeably different from what had come before, or since, but that were widely embraced by even traditionally minded fans. A dark burgundy was adopted as the main team color, with a classic pinstripe style for home uniforms. Blue was almost entirely dropped as part of the team's official color scheme, except in one area; a pale blue (as opposed to traditional grey) was used as the base-color for away game uniforms from 1972 to 1988. Yet the most important aspect of the 1970 uniform change was the adoption of one of the more distinctive logos in sports; a Phillies "P" that, thanks to its unique shape and "baseball stitched" center swirl, remained instantly recognizable and admired, long after its regular use had ended. It was while wearing this uniform style and color motif that the club achieved its most enduring success, including a World Series title in 1980 and another World Series appearance in 1983. Its continued popularity with fans is still evident. Even today, Phillies' home games can contain many fans sporting caps, shirts, and/or jackets emblazoned with the iconic "P" and burgundy color scheme. The current team has worn the burgundy and powder blue throwbacks whenever their opponents are wearing throwback uniforms from that era. Additionally, this uniform also marked the first appearance of "racing stripes" on a baseball uniform (striping going down the jersey shoulders, the side of the pants and up to the sides of the jersey up to the armpit), which would be seen on several other MLB teams for the next quarter-century.

Controversial uniform changes
In 1979, the Phillies' front office modified the uniform into an all-burgundy version with white trimmings, to be worn for Saturday games. They were called "Saturday Night Specials" and were worn for the first and last time on May 19, 1979,  a 10–5 loss to the Montreal Expos. The immediate reaction of the media, fans, and players alike was negative, with many describing the despised uniforms as pajama-like. As such, the idea was hastily abandoned. Mike Schmidt did wear the uniform during the MLB All-Star Tour of Japan following the 1979 season. During the closing ceremonies at Veterans Stadium on September 28, 2003, there was a procession of former players during the post-game ceremony, most in uniform. Larry Christenson, the starting pitcher in the original game, came out wearing this old burgundy uniform, and was the only one to do so. The Phillies wore this jersey again for the 40th anniversary of the original game on July 27, 2019. Christenson threw out the ceremonial first pitch. They lost to the Atlanta Braves 15–7.

Another uniform controversy arose in 1994, when the Phillies introduced all-blue caps on Opening Day that were to be worn for home day games only. The caps were unpopular with the players, who considered them bad luck after two losses and wanted them discontinued. Management wanted to keep using the caps as planned, as they sold well to fans. A compromise was reached: the players agreed to wear them for weekday games while returning to the customary red caps for Sunday afternoon games. In all, the Phillies wore the "unlucky" blue caps for seven games in 1994, losing six (the lone victory a 5–2 triumph over the Florida Marlins on June 29). A slightly different blue cap (with a red bill) was introduced in 2008 as part of the alternate home uniform for day games, a throwback to the late 1940s.

Rivalries

New York Mets

The rivalry between the New York Mets and the Phillies has been said to be among the "hottest" rivalries in the National League. The two National League East divisional rivals have met each other recently in playoff, division, and wild card races.

Aside from several brawls in the 1980s, the rivalry remained low-key before the 2006 season, as the teams had seldom been equally good at the same time. Since 2006, the teams have battled for playoff position. The Mets won the division in 2006 and contended in 2007 and 2008, while the Phillies won five consecutive division titles from 2007 to 2011. The Phillies' 2007 Eastern Division Title was won on the last day of the season as the Mets lost a seven-game lead with 17 games remaining.

Pittsburgh Pirates

The rivalry between the Phillies and the Pittsburgh Pirates was considered by some to be one of the best rivalries in the National League. The rivalry started when the Pittsburgh Pirates entered National League play in their fifth season of 1887, four years after the Phillies.

The Phillies and the Pirates had remained together after the National League split into two divisions in 1969. During the period of two-division play (1969–1993), the two National League East division rivals won the two highest numbers of division championships, reigning exclusively as NL East champions in the 1970s and again in the early 1990s, the Pirates nine, the Phillies six; together, the teams' 15 championships accounted for more than half of the 25 NL East championships during that span.

After the Pirates moved to the National League Central in 1994, the teams face each other in only two series each year and the rivalry has diminished. However, many fans, especially older ones, retain their dislike for the other team and regional differences between Eastern and Western Pennsylvania still fuel the rivalry. The rivalry between the Philadelphia Flyers and the Pittsburgh Penguins in the National Hockey League is also fiercely contested.

Historical rivalries

City Series: Philadelphia Athletics

The City Series was the name of a series of baseball games played between the Philadelphia Athletics of the American League and the Phillies that ran from 1903 through 1955. After the A's move to Kansas City, Missouri in 1955, the City Series rivalry came to an end. The teams have since faced each other in Interleague play (since its introduction in 1997) but the rivalry has effectively died in the intervening years since the A's left Philadelphia. In 2014, when the A's faced the Phillies in inter-league play at Oakland Coliseum, the Athletics did not bother to mark the historical connection, going so far as to have a Connie Mack promotion the day before the series while the Texas Rangers were in Oakland.

The first City Series was held in 1883 between the Phillies and the American Association's Athletics. When the Athletics first joined the American League, the two teams played each other in a spring and fall series. No City Series was held in 1901 and 1902 due to legal warring between the National and American Leagues.

Roster

Team records

Team managers

Over 126 seasons, the Phillies' franchise has employed 55 managers. The duties of the team manager include team strategy and leadership on and off the field. Seven managers have taken the Phillies to the postseason, with Danny Ozark and Charlie Manuel each leading the team to at least three playoff appearances. Manuel and Dallas Green are the only Phillies' managers to win a World Series: Green in 1980 against the Kansas City Royals; and Manuel in 2008 against the Tampa Bay Rays. Charlie Manuel is the longest-tenured manager in franchise history, with 1,416 games of service in parts of nine seasons (2005–2013). The records and accomplishments of Phillies' managers since 1991 are shown below

Achievements

Awards

Six Phillies have won Most Valuable Player Awards during their career with the team. Mike Schmidt leads with three wins, with back-to-back MVPs in 1980 and 1981, and in 1986 as well. Chuck Klein (1932), Jim Konstanty (1950), Ryan Howard (2006), Jimmy Rollins (2007), and Bryce Harper (2021) all have one. Pitcher Steve Carlton leads the team in Cy Young Award wins with four (1972, 1977, 1980, and 1982), while John Denny (1983), Steve Bedrosian (1987), and Roy Halladay (2010) each have one. Four Phillies have won Rookie of the Year honors as well. Jack Sanford won in 1957, Dick Allen in 1964. Third baseman Scott Rolen brought home the honors in 1997, while Howard was the most recent Phillies' winner in 2005. In doing so, Howard became only the second player in MLB history to win Rookie of the Year and Most Valuable Player in consecutive years, Cal Ripken Jr. of the Baltimore Orioles being the first.

Of the 18 players who have hit four home runs in one game, three were Phillies at the time (more than any other team). Ed Delahanty was the first, hitting his four in Chicago's West Side Park on July 13, 1896. Chuck Klein repeated the feat nearly 40 years later to the day, on July 10, 1936, at Pittsburgh's Forbes Field. Forty years later, on April 17, 1976, Mike Schmidt became the third, with his hits in Chicago at Wrigley Field.

Hall of Famers

See footnote

Ford C. Frick Award recipients

Retired numbers and other honors

The Phillies have retired eight numbers, and honored two additional players with the letter "P" which stands for the team’s name. Grover Cleveland Alexander played with the team in the era before Major League Baseball used uniform numbers, and Chuck Klein wore a variety of numbers with the team during his career. Of the eight players with retired numbers, seven were retired for their play with the Phillies and one, 42, was universally retired by Major League Baseball when they honored the 50th anniversary of Jackie Robinson's breaking the color barrier.

Wall of Fame

From 1978 to 2003, the Phillies inducted one former Phillie and one former member of the Philadelphia Athletics per year. Since 2004 they have inducted one Phillie annually. Players must be retired and must have played at least four years with the Phillies or Athletics. In March 2004, the Athletics plaques were relocated to the Philadelphia Athletics Historical Society in Hatboro, Pennsylvania, and a single plaque listing all of the A's inductees was attached to a statue of Connie Mack located across the street from Citizens Bank Park. The Phillies' inductees to the Wall of Fame are listed below (note that there was no inductee for the 2017 season, as Pete Rose was intended to be inducted, but was not due to controversial allegations):

The Wall of Fame was located in Ashburn Alley at Citizens Bank Park from 2004 to 2017, until the 2018 season when it was relocated to a more spacious location behind the stadium's left-field scoreboard.

{| class="wikitable"
! colspan="6" style=";| Philadelphia Baseball Wall of Fame
|-
!scope="col" style=";| Inducted
!scope="col" style=";| Player
!scope="col" style=";| Position
!scope="col" style=";| Years
!class="unsortable" style=";| Ref</onlyinclude>
|- align="center"
| 
!scope="row" style="background-color:#ffffbb;"| 
| P
| –
| 
|- align="center"
| 
!scope="row" style="background-color:#ffffbb;"| 
| OFTV
| ––
| 
|- align="center"
| 
!scope="row" style="background-color:#ffffbb;"| 
| OF
| –––
| 
|- align="center"
| 
!scope="row" style="background-color:#ffffbb;"| 
| P
| –
| 
|- align="center"
| 
!scope="row"| 
| OF
| –
| 
|- align="center"
| 
!scope="row" style="background-color:#ffffbb;"| 
| P
| ––
| 
|- align="center"
| 
!scope="row" style="background-color:#ffffbb;"| 
| OF
| ––
| 
|- align="center"
| 
!scope="row" | 
| OF
| –
| 
|- align="center"
| 
!scope="row" | 
| SS
| –
| 
|- align="center"
| 
!scope="row" | 
| MGRGMEXEC
| , –––
| 
|- align="center"
| 
!scope="row" style="background-color:#ffffbb;"| 
| P
| –
| 
|- align="center"
| 
!scope="row" style="background-color:#ffffbb;"| 
| 3B
| –
| 
|- align="center"
| 
!scope="row" | 
| SSMGR
| ––
| 
|- align="center"
| 
!scope="row" | 
| P
| –
| 
|- align="center"
| 
!scope="row" | 
| P
| –
| 
|- align="center"
| 
!scope="row" | 
| 1B/3B/OF
| ––
| 
|- align="center"
| 
!scope="row" | 
| 3B
| –
| 
|- align="center"
| 
!scope="row" style="background-color:#ffffbb;"| 
| OF
| –
| 
|- align="center"
| 
!scope="row" | 
| OF
| –
| 
|- align="center"
| 
!scope="row" | 
| OF
| –
| 
|- align="center"
| 
!scope="row" | 
| P
| –
| 
|- align="center"
| 
!scope="row" | 
| OFMGR
| ––
| 
|- align="center"
| 
!scope="row" | 
| OF
| –
| 
|- align="center"
| 
!scope="row" | 
| 2B
| ––
| 
|- align="center"
| 
!scope="row" | 
| OF
| –
| 
|- align="center"
| 
!scope="row" style="background-color:#ffffbb;"| 
| OF
| –
| 
|- align="center"
| 
!scope="row" | 
| C
| –
| 
|- align="center"
| 
!scope="row" | 
| PMGR
| ––
| 
|- align="center"
| 
!scope="row" | 
| INFCOEXEC
| –, –––
| 
|- align="center"
| 
!scope="row" | 
| 2BCO
| ––
| 
|- align="center"
| 
!scope="row" style="background:#cfc;"| 
| TV
| –
| 
|- align="center"
| 
!scope="row" | 
| C
| –
| 
|- align="center"
| 
!scope="row" | 
| 1BTV
| ––present
| 
|- align="center"
| 
!scope="row" | 
| C
| –
| 
|- align="center"
| 
!scope="row" | 
| P
| –
| 
|- align="center"
| 
!scope="row" | 
| MGR
| –
| 
|- align="center"
| 
!scope="row" | 
| OF
| –
|
|- align="center"
| 
!scope="row" style="background-color:#ffffbb;"| 
| 1B
| –, 
|
|- align="center"
| 
!colspan="5" | 
|- align="center"
| rowspan=2|
!scope="row" style="background-color:#ffffbb;"| 
| GMEXEC
| ––present
| rowspan=2|
|- align="center"
!scope="row" style="background-color:#ffffbb;"| 
| P
| –
|- align="center"
| 
!scope="row" | 
| OF
| –
| 
|- align="center"
| 
!scope="row" |
| 2B
| –
| 
|- align="center"
| rowspan=2|
!scope="row" |
| RF/CF
| –
| rowspan=2|
|- align="center"
!scope="row" |
| P
| –
|}

Centennial Team
In 1983, rather than inducting a player into the Wall of Fame, the Phillies selected their Centennial Team, commemorating the best players of the first 100 years in franchise history.

Philadelphia Sports Hall of Fame

Team captains

Jimmie Wilson 1927–1928
Fresco Thompson 1928–1930
Granny Hamner 1952–1959
Mike Schmidt 1978–1979

Minor league affiliations

Radio and television

As of 2018, the Phillies' flagship radio stations is WIP-FM (94.1 FM), formerly owned by CBS Radio, but since November 2017, is owned by Philadelphia-area company Entercom. The broadcasts were discontinued on the former AM flagship station WPHT 1210 in 2016. Scott Franzke provides play-by-play on the radio, with Larry Andersen, Michael Bourn, Chad Durbin, Erik Kratz, and Kevin Stocker as color commentators. Meanwhile, NBCUniversal (a unit of Philadelphia-based Comcast) handles local television broadcasts through its properties NBC Sports Philadelphia and WCAU (NBC Channel 10). WCAU broadcasts are syndicated to WHP-DT2 in Harrisburg and WQMY-TV in Wilkes-Barre. Tom McCarthy calls play-by-play for the television broadcasts, with John Kruk, Ruben Amaro Jr, Ben Davis, and Mike Schmidt providing color commentary.

Spanish language broadcasts are on WTTM (1680 AM) with Oscar Budejen on play-by-play, and Bill Kulik on color commentary.

Other popular Phillies broadcasters through the years include By Saam (1939–1975), Bill Campbell (1962–1970), Richie Ashburn (1963–1997), and Harry Kalas (1971–2009). Kalas, a 2002 recipient of the Ford Frick Award and an icon in the Philadelphia area, called play-by-play in the first three and last three innings on television and the fourth inning on the radio until his death on April 13, 2009.

At Citizens Bank Park, the restaurant built into the base of the main scoreboard is named "Harry the K's" in Kalas' honor. After his death, the Phillies' TV broadcast booth was renamed "The Harry Kalas Broadcast Booth".  It is directly next to the radio-broadcast booth, which is named "The Richie 'Whitey' Ashburn Broadcast Booth".  When the Phillies win at home, Kalas' rendition of the song "High Hopes", which he would sing when the Phillies had clinched a playoff berth or advanced in the playoffs, is played as fans file out of the stadium. In addition, when a Phillies player hits a home run, a recording of Kalas' famous "That ball is outta here!" home run call is played.  The sole exception is Chase Utley, once the subject of another famous Kalas call, "Chase Utley, you are The Man!", which was played when Utley hit a homer.

In 2011, the Phillies unveiled a statue of Harry Kalas at Citizens Bank Park. It was funded by Phillies' fans and designed and constructed by a Phillies' fan.

The Phillies' public-address (PA) announcer is Dan Baker, who started in the 1972 season.

In 2011, the Phillies spent $10 million to upgrade the video system at Citizens Bank Park, including a new display screen in left field, making it the largest in the National League at 76 feet high and 97 feet wide.

Community

Charitable contributions
Since 1984, the Phillies have supported research related to amyotrophic lateral sclerosis (ALS, also known as Lou Gehrig's disease) with the "Phillies Phestival". The team raised over US$750,000 for ALS research at their 2008 festival, compared with approximately $4,500 at the inaugural event in 1984; the event has raised over $10 million in its history. The ALS Association of Philadelphia is the Phillies' primary charity, and the hospitals they support include Pennsylvania Hospital, Thomas Jefferson University Hospital, and Hahnemann University Hospital. Former Phillies' pitchers Geoff Geary, who lost a friend to the disease, and Curt Schilling, who retired with the Boston Red Sox, are still involved with the Phillies' cause.

Education and anti-drug programs
The Phillies have a reading incentive program called Phanatic About Reading, which is designed to encourage students from kindergarten to eighth grade to read for a minimum of 15 minutes a night. This reading program is designed to help students with their literacy skills and comprehension. Phillies Phundamentals is another educational program, offered through after-school and summer camps, that is designed to make learning fun and support academic skills by using baseball.

The Phillies celebrate teachers during their annual Teacher Appreciation Night.

The “Cut Out Overdoses” anti-drug campaign, sponsored by Mothers Against Prescription Drug Abuse (MAPDA) and Emergent Biosolutions, manufacturer of the overdose antagonist Narcan, highlights the drug overdose problem through special communications programs at Citizens Bank Park, home of the Phillies. (There are identical programs supported by both the Boston Red Sox and Cincinnati Reds.) In 2020, the stadium, fan-empty due to the coronavirus pandemic, featured “cut-out” cardboard figures of fans filling the stands. Clicking on one of the silhouettes leads to the anguished story of the overdose death of an individual, written by family members. The story also encourages readers to take a stand by learning more about opioid-reversal medication and making a donation to MAPDA. The site reports that an American dies from an accidental opioid overdose every 15 minutes, over 35,000 people annually.

Fan support and reputation

Phillies' fans have earned a reputation over the years for their occasional unruly behavior. In the 1960s, radio announcers for visiting teams would frequently report on the numerous fights breaking out in Connie Mack Stadium. Immediately after the final game at the old park, many fans ran onto the field or dislodged parts of the ballpark to take home with them. Later, at Veterans Stadium, the 700 Level gained a reputation for its "hostile taunting, fighting, public urination and general strangeness". Phillies fans are famously known for their reputation for being the "Meanest Fans in America".

Phillies' fans are known for harsh criticism of their own stars such the 1964 Rookie of the Year Richie Allen and Hall of Fame third baseman Mike Schmidt. The fans, however, are just as well known for heckling the visiting team. Los Angeles Dodgers pitcher Burt Hooton's poor performance during game three of the 1977 NLCS has often been attributed to the crowd's taunting. J. D. Drew, the Phillies' first overall draft pick in the amateur draft of 1997, never signed with the Phillies following a contract dispute with the team, instead re-entering the draft the next year to be drafted by the St. Louis Cardinals. Phillies fans were angered over this disrespect and hurled debris, including two D batteries, at Drew during an August 1999 game.

Many sportswriters have noted the passionate presence of Phillies fans. Allen Barra wrote that the biggest roar he ever heard from Philadelphia fans was in 1980 when Tug McGraw, in the victory parade after the World Series, told New York fans they could "take this championship and shove it."

When the Phillies moved to Veterans Stadium, they hired a group of young ladies to serve as ushers. These women wore maroon-colored outfits featuring hot pants and were called the Hot Pants Patrol.  The team also introduced a pair of mascots attired in colonial garb, named Philadelphia Phil and Phyllis. In addition to costumed characters, animated Phil and Phyllis figures mounted on the center-field facade would "hit" the Liberty Bell after a Phillies home run. This pair of mascots never achieved any significant level of popularity with fans and were eventually discontinued. In 1978, the team introduced a new mascot, the Phillie Phanatic, who has been called "baseball's best mascot", which has been much more successful and has become closely associated with the marketing of the team.

In Phillies' fan culture, it is also not unusual to replace an "f" with a "ph" in words, such as the Phillie Phanatic.

The club surpassed 100 consecutive sellouts on August 19, 2010, selling out over 50% of their home games and averaging an annual attendance of over 3.1 million fans since moving to Citizens Bank Park; on April 3, 2011, the team broke the three-game series attendance record at the ballpark, having 136,254 fans attend the opening weekend against the Houston Astros.

In 2011 and 2012, the Phillies led the league in attendance with 3,680,718 and 3,565,718 fans, respectively, coming out to watch Phillies baseball.

The Phillies now boast active international support groups on social media, with a Philadelphia Phillies' UK Facebook group starting in August 2015 and UK Phillies' Twitter account created in May 2017. In March 2018 a Phillies' France account launched in French.

See also
List of Philadelphia Phillies broadcasters
List of Philadelphia Phillies first-round draft picks
List of Philadelphia Phillies Opening Day starting pitchers
List of Philadelphia Phillies seasons
Sports in Philadelphia

References

Further reading
Giles, Bill with Doug Myers. Pouring Six Beers at a Time and Other Stories from a Lifetime in Baseball (Triumph Books, 2007).
Fitzpatrick, Frank. You Can't Lose 'Em All: The Year the Phillies Finally Won the World Series (Taylor Trade Publishing, 2001).

Kashatus, William C. September Swoon: Richie Allen, the '64 Phillies and Racial Integration (Penn State University Press, 2004).
Kashatus, William C. Almost A Dynasty: The Rise and Fall of the 1980 Phillies (University of Pennsylvania Press, 2008). 
Kashatus, William C. Macho Row: The 1993 Phillies and Baseball's Unwritten Code (University of Nebraska Press, 2017).
Kulick, Bruce. To Every Thing A Season: Shibe Park and Urban Philadelphia, 1909–1976 (Princeton University Press, 1991).
Matthews, Gary with Phil Pepe. Few and Chosen: Defining Phillies Greatness Across the Eras (Triumph Books, 2012).
Roberts, Robin with C. Paul Rogers III. THe Whiz Kids and the 1950 Pennant (Temple University Press, 1996).
Westcott, Rich and Frank Bilovsky. The Phillies Encyclopedia (Temple University Press, 2004. 3rd edition).

External links

 

 
Major League Baseball teams
Grapefruit League
Professional baseball teams in Pennsylvania
Baseball teams established in 1883
Sports in Philadelphia
1883 establishments in Pennsylvania